Sarah Byam is the author of Billi 99.

Biography
During the 1990s Byam wrote a variety of comic books for different publishers. This writing includes the series Mode Extreme and Black Canary. She also wrote individual stories for Elfquest, What If, Glyph and other publications.

She is married to the illustrator David Lee Ingersoll.

Awards
1992: Nominated for "Best Writer" Eisner Award, for Billi 99

Notes

References

External links
Biography

American comics writers
Female comics writers
Year of birth missing (living people)
Living people